S. polymorpha may refer to:

 Sacciolepis polymorpha, a true grass
 Scolopendra polymorpha, a centipede indigenous to the Southwestern United States and northern Mexico
 Siphonosopra polymorpha, a possibly carcinogenic microorganism
 Sporichthya polymorpha, a gram-positive bacterium
 Stigmella polymorpha, a pigmy moth
 Synaphea polymorpha, a plant endemic to Western Australia